The Lake-to-Lake Trail is an urban  network of paved multi-use paths that runs between numerous lakes in Lakeland, Florida. The southern terminus of the trail can be accessed from the shores of Lake John.  From there, the trail circles Lake Hollingsworth, running by Florida Southern College, then travels west through downtown Lakeland and by Lake Hunter, Lake Beulah, Lake Wire, Lake Mirror, Lake Morton, Lake Bonny, where it passes by Southeastern University, and finally winds up along Lake Parker. The city considers Lake Mirror to be the "hub" of the trail.

References

Hiking trails in Florida
Rail trails in Florida
Bike paths in Florida
Transportation in Polk County, Florida
Parks in Polk County, Florida
Lakeland, Florida